First Baptist Church of Painted Post is a historic Baptist church located at Painted Post in Steuben County, New York. The church was originally built in 1860 and expanded and remodeled in 1915 by architects Pierce & Bickford after a fire destroyed the mid-19th century building's tower and spire. The front wing features two massive square corner towers surmounted by louvered bell towers and bell curved roofs.

It was listed on the National Register of Historic Places in 1999.

References

External links

First Baptist Church of Painted Post website

Baptist churches in New York (state)
Churches on the National Register of Historic Places in New York (state)
Renaissance Revival architecture in New York (state)
Churches completed in 1915
20th-century Baptist churches in the United States
Churches in Steuben County, New York
National Register of Historic Places in Steuben County, New York
1915 establishments in New York (state)